Talking with Strangers is an album first issued in the UK in 2009, by Judy Dyble featuring Robert Fripp, Ian McDonald, Julianne Regan, Simon Nicol, Tim Bowness, Jacqui McShee, Pat Mastelotto, Alistair Murphy, Celia Humphris, Laurie A'Court, Rachel Hall, Mark Fletcher, Jeremy Salmon, Paul Robinson, John Gillies, Sanchia Pattinson and Harry Fletcher.

Releases

The album was initially issued by Dyble's manager, Jon Sheller, credited on the inlay as 'Jon the m' on his own Brilliant/Fixit via Universal imprint, and has subsequently been re-issued twice on vinyl, with different artwork on both versions. In Scandinavia a cd version was issued by Termo. Dyble, Bowness and Murphy made promotional TV appearances and radio broadcasts.

Dyble made numerous BBC and independent radio appearances to promote the release.

Additionally, Dark Peak productions released an imported version in Japan. Late 2012 saw a deal signed for the first official release of the album in the USA via Gonzo Multimedia. The release date being late February 2013.

The album features a near 20-minute biopic of Dyble's life ("Harpsong"), and is described as being in the musical style of prog-folk.

The UK release received reviews including being described as a "sophisticated triumph" and was selected as HMV stores 'recommended album of the year' 2009 in the specialist music sector.

The first UK pressing featured the artwork of 1960s psychedelic artist John Hurford and inner sleeve illustration by Koldo Barroso. This version is sold out and deleted as of December 2009. The second UK pressing (and subsequent releases feature the artwork and designs of Jackie Morris.

Upon the UK release, Dyble played a press and a headline show at the 100 club, this was the first time she had appeared on stage in London since the days of her being the lead singer of Fairport Convention and Trader Horne in the late 1960s. The band included Simon Nicol, Tim Bowness, Alistair Murphy, Rachel Hall from Big Big Train.

Reception
David Kidman wrote a very positive review in August 2009. Of "Harpsong" he writes "the experimental wyrd-folk of Trader Horne meets the nascent prog-rock of King Crimson head-on".

Track listing

Release history

References

Judy Dyble albums
2009 albums